Arki palace is located in Arki, India, a town in Himachal Pradesh.

The Arki palace was built between 1695 - 1700 by Rana Prithvi Singh, a descendant of Rana Sabha Chand. The Fort was captured by the Gurkhas in 1806. Rana Jagat Singh, the ruler of Baghal had to take refuge in Nalagarh. During this period from 1806 - 1815, the Gurkha General Amar Singh Thapa used Arki as his stronghold to make further advances into Himachal Pradesh as far as Kangra. Arki was the capital of the princely hill state of Baghal, which was founded by Rana Ajai Dev, a Panwar Rajput. The state was founded around 1643 and Arki was declared as its capital by Rana Sabha Chand in 1650.

Accommodation and rest houses
There are few private hotels in Arki besides one PWD rest house and one forest department rest house.

Gallery

References

Monuments and memorials in Punjab, India
Forts in Himachal Pradesh
Heritage hotels in India
Forts in Punjab, India
Rajput architecture
Buildings and structures in Solan district